Old Tarpon Springs High School (also known as the Tarpon Springs City Hall) is a historic school building in Tarpon Springs, in the United States state of Florida. It is located at 324 East Pine Street. On October 11, 1990, it was added to the National Register of Historic Places.

References

National Register of Historic Places in Pinellas County, Florida
High schools in Pinellas County, Florida
Public high schools in Florida
Buildings and structures in Tarpon Springs, Florida
1925 establishments in Florida
School buildings completed in 1925